Islands Point is a high rock point separating Berg Bay and Relay Bay, lying along the west shore of Robertson Bay in Victoria Land, Antarctica. The headland was charted by the northern party of the British Antarctic Expedition, 1910–13, under Captain Robert Falcon Scott, and was probably named with reference to the small island (Sphinx Rock) which lies just north of the point. The headland lies situated on the Pennell Coast, a portion of Antarctica lying between Cape Williams and Cape Adare.

References

Islands of Victoria Land
Pennell Coast